The Mexican state of Oaxaca was embroiled in a conflict that lasted more than seven months and resulted in at least seventeen deaths and the occupation of the capital city of Oaxaca by the Popular Assembly of the Peoples of Oaxaca (APPO). The conflict emerged in May 2006 with the police responding to a strike involving the local teachers' trade union by opening fire on non-violent protests.  It then grew into a broad-based movement pitting the Popular Assembly of the Peoples of Oaxaca (APPO) against the state's governor, Ulises Ruiz Ortiz. Protesters demanded the removal or resignation of Ortiz, whom they accused of political corruption and acts of repression.  Multiple reports, including from international human rights monitors, accused the Mexican government of using death squads, summary executions, and even violating Geneva Conventions standards that prohibit attacking and shooting at unarmed medics attending to the wounded.
One human rights observer claimed over twenty-seven were killed by the police violence.  The dead included Brad Will, Emilio Alonso Fabián, José Alberto López Bernal, Fidel Sánchez García, and Esteban Zurita López.

Organisation 
After the police fired on non-violent protesters, the teacher's union fought back and were able to force the police out of the city and establish a citywide anarchist community for several months. The teacher's union and other worker's and community groups form the APPO which created large democratic assemblies for citizens.

According to one activist who helped to found the APPO:So the APPO was formed to address the abuses and create an alternative. It was to be a space for discussion, reflection, analysis, and action. We recognized that it shouldn’t be just one organization, but rather a blanket coordinating body for many different groups. That is, not one ideology would prevail; we would focus on finding the common ground among diverse social actors. Students, teachers, anarchists, Marxists, churchgoers — everyone was invited.The APPO was born without a formal structure, but soon developed impressive organizational capacity. Decisions in the APPO are made by consensus within the general assembly, which was privileged as a decision-making body. In the first few weeks of our existence we created the APPO State Council. The council was originally composed of 260 people — approximately ten representatives from each of Oaxaca’s seven regions and representatives from Oaxaca’s urban neighborhoods and municipalities.The Provisional Coordination was created to facilitate the operation of the APPO through different commissions. A variety of commissions were established: judicial, finance, communications, human rights, gender equity, defense of natural resources, and many more. Proposals are generated in smaller assemblies of each sector of the APPO and then brought to the general assembly where they are debated further or ratified.There was deep tension in the group between the more radical and libertarian elements who rejected representative democracy and wanted to create a permanent self-organised society against the more conservative and moderate elements who wanted elections. Ultimately, the radicals were more successful and the elections were boycotted by most of the population. The APPO was also able to organise festivals, defensive measures, radio stations and a neighbourhood watch. The festivals, the 'Guelaguetza' thousands of people attended for free to see indigenous culture, dresses and dancing whilst graffiti artists packed the streets and covered the walls of the towns in anti-government and anti-capitalist messages. The APPO also used 'topiles' as a method of keeping the peace. These were neighbourhood watches that also doubled as a militia which fought off government soldiers often with little more than rocks and fireworks. If a criminal was found to be disturbing someone, a bell would be used to alert the nearest topile, who would either give them a minor fine or perhaps hold them for the night. The topiles were successful in organising first aid centres and garbage collection.

May and June 2006
In May 2006, a teachers' strike began in the Zócalo in the Mexican city of Oaxaca.  2006 was the 25th consecutive year that Oaxaca's teachers had struck. Previously, the protests had generally lasted for one to two weeks and had resulted in small raises for teachers.  The 2006 strike began in protest of the low funding for teachers and rural schools in the state, but was prompted to additionally call for the resignation of the state governor Ulises Ruiz Ortiz after 3000 police were sent to break up the occupation in the early morning of June 14, 2006.  A street battle lasted for several hours that day, resulting in more than one hundred hospitalizations but no fatalities.  Ortiz declared that he would not resign.  
In response to the events of June 14, representatives of Oaxaca's state regions and municipalities, unions, non-governmental organizations, social organizations, cooperatives, and parents convened to form the Popular Assembly of the Peoples of Oaxaca (APPO, from its Spanish name, Asamblea Popular de los Pueblos de Oaxaca). On June 17 APPO reestablished encampments in the zocalo and declared itself to be the governing body of Oaxaca, plunging the city into a state of civil rebellion. Barricades were constructed across some streets in an effort to prevent further police raids.  APPO began to seek country-wide solidarity with their movement and urged other states within Mexico to similarly organize popular assemblies at every level of social organization: neighborhoods, street blocks, unions, and towns. Various municipality offices across the state closed in unity.  A popular mantra was, “No leader is going to solve our problems”.

Though APPO did not boycott the Mexican national elections on July 2, Ulises Ruiz's Institutional Revolutionary Party (PRI) suffered electoral defeat in Oaxaca, a state they had ruled for seventy years.

APPO did agree to boycott the annual Guelaguetza festival in the final weeks of July. Protesters blocked access to the auditorium in which the festival is held using burned buses and miscellaneous trash, thus preventing the finalization of renovations to the facility. This action drew criticism due to the damage that some individuals did to the auditorium by starting fires and spray painting graffiti. Some of the graffiti said: "Tourists, go home! In Oaxaca we are not capitalists". As a result of the boycott, the government cancelled the celebration of the festival – in its stead the APPO held an alternative version of the cultural festival over the course of several days.

The action marked the lowest point of government for Ulises Ruiz, who subsequently left the State. He resided in Mexico City for a few months.

After a few weeks of absence, the APPO assumed control of the city and started implementing their own law, while confrontations with State Police escalated.

August 2006
August 1 saw the beginning of APPO's break in of television and radio stations throughout the city. While all of these stations are no longer occupied by APPO members, the use of radio has been an important facet of the movement. APPO utilized the radio resources in order to communicate about possible threats from police and armed gangs, demand the removal of Ulises Ruiz and the release of political prisoners. During APPO's illegal occupation of the radio stations, pro-PRI and PRI-funded groups engaged in frequent late-night armed attacks on APPO-controlled radio stations and damaged their broadcasting equipment.

Those attacks on the APPO-controlled radio stations represented an escalation of violence in a conflict that (despite constant rumors of threats) had remained relatively peaceful since the June 14 police raid. In what was called a "cleanup operation", armed groups of men attacked the APPO's barricades during the nights. The individuals involved were identified as members of pro-PRI organizations and as plain-clothes local police. These attacks, combined with other shootings and assassinations, resulted in the first deaths associated with the conflict, in which six APPO supporters were killed.<ref>{{cite news|url = http://www.jornada.unam.mx/2006/08/09/index.php?section=sociedad&article=047n1soc|title = Ejecutan a catedrático de la Universidad de Oaxaca|newspaper = La Jornada|language = es|date = 9 August 2006|access-date = 15 November 2006}}</ref>

September 2006
On September 14, striking teachers and APPO members took over the municipal building in Huautla de Jiménez, located in the Sierra Mazateca in northern Oaxaca. They retained control of the building until mid-January 2007 (months after the government regained control of Oaxaca City), when Oaxacan state police briefly occupied the city, patrolling the streets with large guns and guarding the municipio all hours of the day and night.

The leader of Mazatecan APPO, Agustín Sosa, was elected mayor (presidente) of Huautla de Jiménez in November 2007, to a term beginning in January, 2008. Sosa is a longtime activist who spent many months in jail in 2004, accused of murder in the death of a protester (at the hands of the police) at a protest organized by Sosa. He bears no relation to Flavio Sosa, the still imprisoned leader of APPO.

October 2006

On October 27, 2006, Bradley Roland Will, a U.S. Indymedia journalist from New York who had entered the country under a tourist visa, was killed along with Professor Emilio Alonso Fabián and Esteban López Zurita, in what the Associated Press has claimed was a "shootout" between protesters and a group of armed men. Photographs by Brad Will, however, demonstrate that the protesters were throwing rocks at the gunman. Photographs of Will, after he was shot, show a man lying on the ground, surrounded by friends, and not the "armed gangs" that the Associated Press has reported.  An autopsy by the Mexican government has concluded that "two shots" were fired at Will, one from in front and one from behind (which, the government alleges, was fired by a protester).  The body was never examined for blood clotting in the second wound, which would have demonstrated that it was "implemented" in the morgue. Brad Will's body was cremated.  The family of Brad Will visited Mexico to demand justice from the court system, and upon hearing the accusation that their son was shot at close range by a protester, they called it "ridiculous, false, without substance, biased, and unconvincing." They also accused the District Attorney of falsifying evidence and acting in bad faith.

However, protesters claim the shooting was by a group of armed men against unarmed protesters. Oswaldo Ramírez, a photographer for Mexico City daily Milenio, was also shot in the foot. Lizbeth Cana, attorney general of Oaxaca, claims the shooting of the protesters was provoked by the protesters themselves and that the armed men who engaged them were upset residents from the area. The U.S. ambassador to Mexico, Tony Garza, however, claims the men may have been local police. El Universal'' has identified some of the men as local officials. Protesters also allege that the men were police and not local residents. Indymedia claims from a first-hand witness that the man who shot Will was an "urban paramilitary" member of the Institutional Revolutionary Party. A local news organisation, Centro de Medios Libres, claims that from Will's recovered videotapes, they have found that Pedro Carmona, a paramilitary who was the mayor of Felipe Carrillo Puerto in Santa Lucía del Camino, was the person who shot Bradley Roland Will. Another shooting took place later in the day outside the state prosecutor's office, leading to three injuries.

An Associated Press report by Rebeca Romero (December 11, 2006, 12:33 am (ET)) claims, "Most of the nine victims of the Oaxaca violence have been protesters who were shot by armed gangs..."  One protester, in response to the massive denunciations of the state-controlled media, has said, "I saw a young boy shot in the leg, friends around me arrested left and right, bullets flying everywhere.  The government needed someone to blame, and it came down heaviest on the people at the barricades, especially strategic barricades like Cinco Senores.  They called us vandals and thieves and delinquents."

The death of Bradley Roland Will prompted President Vicente Fox to send federal police to Oaxaca after months of attempting to stay neutral in what he considered a local issue.

October 29–30

At least two protesters, Social Security Institute workers Roberto López Hernández and nurse and APPO safety commission member Jorge Alberto Beltrán, were killed when about 3,500 federal police and 3000 military police removed protesters in downtown Oaxaca's Zócalo, with a backup of 5,000 army troops waiting just outside the city. The police forces were met with resistance from protesters and Radio APPO reported police raids (which were denied by the federal government) on activists' homes, helicopters dropped chemical grenades (apparently tear gas) on protesters who had been pushed from the Zócalo. There were multiple unconfirmed reports of a young teenager, but rather a twelve-year-old child, shot in the streets near Puente Tecnológico; the boy's body was reportedly taken by police. There have been some deaths according to local media, and while the APPO claims 'dozens' of deaths, the exact number is yet unknown. Protests continued, with sporadic clashes occurring around the Zócalo, which is held by Federal forces.

Numerous people have been detained; footage shows at least four being removed in a PFP Mi-17 helicopter.

The Mexican Episcopate Conference, an organization of the Catholic Church, supported the intervention of the Federal Police in the conflict.

On October 30, 2006, the Revolutionary Indigenous Clandestine Committee (CCRI) issued a notice condemning the government tactics and the killings, including that of a minor; through the communiqué, the EZLN indicated a four-point response, which included the closing of some highways in the southeast state of Chiapas, and their vocal support to the people of Oaxaca.

November 2006
An open letter written "to honor the memory" of slain journalist Brad Will and support "the Oaxacan people's efforts to establish a popular government that recognizes local traditions and values", was signed in early November by numerous academics and activists, including Noam Chomsky, Naomi Klein, Michael Moore, Arundhati Roy, Starhawk and Howard Zinn.

November 2, 2006
Federal Preventative Police advanced on the Benito Juárez Autonomous University of Oaxaca, occupied by students and displaced protesters from the Zocalo.  Since the university is autonomous, the police are forbidden from entering the grounds, unless invited by the Rector.

Thousands of protesters arrived in the following hours, surrounding the police and eventually forcing them to withdraw from the area surrounding the university. The APPO has also received permission by the university rector, through threats of violence, to broadcast their messages through the university radio, which they have used to criticise political parties, the PRI specifically. Opinions against the APPO are quickly taken off the air

After criticism by the private sector, political organizations and the press (specifically Grupo Formula's news anchor Denise Maerker) for his remarks towards the APPO the rector declared that he had requested respect for the rights of students and faculty and that a tentative operation by the Federal Police would not be a solution to the issue

November 6, 2006
Three explosions in Mexico City destroyed a Scotiabank branch lobby, blew out windows at Mexico's Tribunal Federal Electoral (Federal Electoral Tribunal), and damaged the auditorium at PRI headquarters.  Other homemade bombs were placed in a second Scotiabank branch and in front of the chain restaurant Sanborns, but these were disabled before exploding.  A phone call was placed to authorities shortly before midnight which warned of the bombings.

None of the exploded bombs resulted in injuries or death.

A coalition of five leftist guerrilla groups from Oaxaca claimed responsibility for the blasts. There are no known ties between these guerrilla groups and Oaxacan protesters, and APPO members denied any involvement in or knowledge of the bombings.

November 10–13, 2006
Despite the presence of federal police in the city, the APPO has continued to organize, holding a Constituent Congress in order to discuss plans to rewrite Oaxaca's political constitution. Likewise, in an attempt to broaden its focus throughout the state and develop future projects, the movement formed the State Council of the Popular Assembly of the Peoples of Oaxaca (CEAPPO). This new council will be formed of 260 representatives from the various regions of Oaxaca, including 40 members of the teachers' union. This represents a major development for the APPO's continuing attempts to develop alternative political proposals while still pushing for the removal of Ulises Ruiz.

November 25–26, 2006
On Saturday, November 25, 2006, a large clash between the federal police and demonstrators occurred in the evening following the seventh megamarch held by the APPO. The march began peacefully, but the situation turned violent when the police responded with tear gas and rubber bullets as protesters attempted to encircle the city's zócalo. It is unclear who instigated the violence, but the clash quickly spread through the city as protesters fought back with rocks and homemade PVC rockets. Police took the APPO encampment in the Santo Domingo plaza and arrested more than 160 people. Many APPO supporters were hospitalized, and the deaths of three protesters were reported but remain unconfirmed.

On Saturday, and continuing on Sunday, November 26, fires were set by the protesters to numerous vehicles, and fires also destroyed or damaged four buildings housing government offices (including a tax and court office), one university building, and an office building of a local trade association. Three hotels were also attacked, and some local businesses were looted.

On Monday, November 27, 2006, the Chief of the Federal Police, Ardelio Vargas, stated that they would no longer have any more tolerance for the APPO. "There will be no more tolerance (...) those who go against the law will have their punishment. The warrants and orders of arrest are not ordered by the police, but by local and federal judges", he said. Efforts have been made to follow through on these threats as movement leaders have been arrested and organizational offices have been raided. After indications that the APPO would assemble at the State University Campus following the weekends confrontations, Vargas said that "there will be no violation of the autonomy of the University"

In the following days the APPO removed the last of their barricades from the city and turned over control of the university radio station to the rector, citing lack of security. APPO leaders have gone into hiding, claiming a repressive crackdown by state authorities against those involved in the movement. The police have been accused of arresting teachers out of classrooms, beating detainees and false arrests.

December 2006
On Monday, December 4, hours after he said at a news conference in Mexico City that he had gone to the capital to negotiate a peaceful solution, Flavio Sosa was arrested by police on charges related to the barricades, vandalism and irregular detentions carried out by some protesters. Sosa's brother, Horacio, and two other men were also arrested on unspecified charges. Flavio Sosa's heavy-set, bearded presence became an emblem of APPO. After his arrest, the PRD, through their speaker, Gerardo Fernandez Noroña, revealed that Sosa was a member of the party's National Council and said that this obliged them to assume Sosa's legal defense.

The following week, the federal police seized armament from Oaxaca's State Police and said that local forces were under investigation based on accusations of murder that the APPO made against them. The APPO reported that the federal government offered to not detain any other members of their movement.

Ulises Ruiz

At the heart of the continuing conflict are attitudes towards the state's governor, Ulises Ruiz, a member of the Institutional Revolutionary Party which governed Mexico for most of the 20th century, but which now is a minority in a nation where political power resides in 3 main parties. However, the main power struggle is between the rightist National Action Party and the leftist Democratic Revolutionary Party, leaving the Institutional Revolutionary Party free to form coalitions with one of the two parties. Ruiz is a polemical figure whom opponents accuse of stealing his 2004 election, suppressing the freedom of the press, destruction of public spaces and historical monuments in the city, and repression of political opponents. Protestors argue that the constitution gives the central government the power under certain circumstances to remove a sitting governor; the Senate of the Republic, voted on the issue and decided that those "special circumstances" are not to be found in Oaxaca.

As the conflict in Oaxaca has grown more intractable, outside pressure on Ruiz to resign has grown, but he has not shown signs of budging. The senate has blamed both the governor and the APPO for the violence that originated in the state, while the business group Coparmex in the state of Puebla and the then Secretary of the Interior Carlos Abascal have called for his resignation or blamed him for the conflict. The APPO has made his resignation or removal their one non-negotiable demand before they will agree to end the conflict.

See also

Autonomous Municipality of San Juan Copala
San Juan Copala
Zapatista Army of National Liberation

References

Education strikes
2006 protests
Protests in Mexico
Oaxaca City
Politics of Oaxaca
2006 in Mexico
Vicente Fox
Political scandals in Mexico
Conflicts in 2006
Politics of Mexico
Labour disputes in Mexico